Tom Friedman may refer to:

Tom Friedman (artist) (born 1965), American sculptor
Thomas Friedman (born 1953), journalist and author

See also
Thomas Freeman (disambiguation)